Blickar som tänder is the second studio album by Swedish band Friends, released in 2000. The album was re-released in 2001 as "Lyssna till ditt hjärta" with two bonus tracks.

The songs "När jag tänker på i morgon", "Holiday", "Vad pojkar gör om natten", "Blickar som tänder"  and "Lyssna till ditt hjärta" all charted at Svensktoppen.

Track listing

First release

2001 bonus tracks

Charts

References

2000 albums
Friends (Swedish band) albums